John Webster (bef August 16, 1590 – April 5, 1661) was an early colonial settler of New England, serving one term as governor of the Colony of Connecticut in 1656.

Early life
Webster was born in Cossington, Leicestershire, England, the son of Matthew Webster (1548–1623) and his wife, Elizabeth Ashton.

Career
In the early 1630s, he traveled to the Massachusetts Bay Colony with his wife and five children, settling in the area of Newtowne (now Cambridge, Massachusetts). He left in 1636, in all probability with Thomas Hooker and his adherents, to settle Hartford, Connecticut. His first public office was as a member of a committee that joined with the Court of Magistrates in determining the course of war with the Pequot Indians. He was chosen from 1639 to 1655 to be magistrate, and in 1655 he was chosen as Deputy Governor of the Colony of Connecticut. In 1656 he was elected governor, and he served as first magistrate from 1657 to 1659.

In addition to his service as Governor of the Connecticut Colony, John Webster was one of the nineteen men representing the towns of Hartford, Wethersfield, and Windsor in 1638-39 who participated in the drafting and adoption of the Fundamental Orders of Connecticut, a document that is widely acknowledged as establishing one of the earliest forms of constitutional government.

Communion controversy
A split amongst the church members in Hartford grew when the current minister at the First Church in Hartford, Samuel Stone, declared that the requirement that stated only parents that had both taken communion should be allowed to have a child baptized would be removed, and non-communicants would be allowed to vote. John Webster, among others, were a part of a council that agreed that this was not acceptable. Reverend Stone chose to ignore this sentiment, and the issue was taken up with the General Court in Massachusetts. The Court ruled that although Reverend Stone had been too strict in ignoring the majority of his parishioners, he was right in liberalizing the baptism ritual. It was also found that those who disagreed with Stone could remove themselves to a location in Massachusetts to practice how they saw fit. This eventual location chosen was Hadley, Massachusetts, and in 1659, a new community was built there. Webster lived there for less than two years, for in 1661 he contracted a fever and died.

Personal life
On November 7, 1609, Webster married Agnes Smith (born August 29, 1585 in Cossington, Leicestershire, England) at Cossington. She died in Hadley, Massachusetts in 1667. They had nine children (all born in England):
 Matthew Webster (b. 1608/09), who married Sarah Waterbury and Mary Reeve
 Margaret Webster (b. 1609/10), who married William Bolton and Thomas Hunt
 William Webster (1614–1688), who married Mary Reeve  (1617–1698) ("Half-Hanged Mary": accused witch who survived being hanged in 1683) 
 Thomas Webster (1616–1686), who married Abigail Sage Alexander  (1647–1688)
 Robert Webster (1619–1676), who married Susanna Treat (1629–1705)
 Anne Webster (1621–1662), who married John Marsh (1618–1688)
 Elizabeth Webster (1622/23–1688), who married William Markham (1621–1690)
 Mary Webster (b. 1623), who married Jonathan Hunt (or died before April 15, 1623)
 Faith Webster (1627–1627), who died 10 days after her birth

Notable descendants

 William Robbins Barnes (1866-1945) - co-founder of Barnes and Noble
 Pat Bagley (1956-) - editorial cartoonist
 Will Bagley (1950-2021) - historian of western America
 Earl W. Bascom (1906-1995) - rodeo pioneer, inventor, cowboy hall of fame inductee, Hollywood actor, western artist and sculptor, "father of modern rodeo"
 George H. W. Bush (1924-2018) - 41st President of the United States
 George W. Bush (1946- ) - 43rd President of the United States
 Richard Bushman (1931- ) - American historian and college professor
 Clara C. M. Cannon (1839-1926) - California pioneer, early leader of Children's Primary
 Johnny Carson (1925-2005) American television celebrity
 Tom C. Clark (1899-1977) - Associate Justice of the U.S. Supreme Court
 Samuel Colt (1814-1862) - American inventor, founder of Colt firearms
 Emily Dickinson (1830-1886} - American poet
 William Faulkner (1897-1962) - American writer and Nobel Prize Laureate
 James E. Faust (1920-2007) - World War II air corp veteran, attorney, politician, religious leader, published author
 Marion D. Hanks (1921-2011) - World War II navy chaplain, religious leader, seminary teacher, author, public speaker, poet, business executive
 John Marshall Harlan II (1899-1971) - Associate Justice of the U.S. Supreme Court
 Franklin S. Harris (1884-1966) - Brigham Young University president, published author
 Rutherford B. Hayes (1822-1893) - 19th President of the United States
 Katharine Hepburn (1907-2003) - American actress
 Henry Hubbard (1784-1857) - 26th Governor of New Hampshire
 Jared Ingersoll (1749-1822) - signer of the Declaration of Independence
 Janis Joplin (1943-1970) - American rock and blues singer
 W. W. Keeler (1908-1987) - President of Phillips Petroleum Company, Chief of the Cherokee Nation
 John Davis Lodge (1903-1985) - 79th Governor of Connecticut
 Francis M. Lyman (1840-1916)) - American politician, attorney, religious leader
 Truman G. Madsen (1926-2009) - university professor, published author, world lecturer, film producer, editor
 Thomas B. Marsh (1800-1866) - American religious leader
 Rachel Scott (1981-1999) - American student, Columbine High School massacre victim
 Reed Smoot (1862-1941) - religious leader, United States Senator
 Jonathan Strong (1944 - ) - American novelist
T. Michael Twomey (1965 -  ) - Attorney and Corporate Officer with Entergy Corporation
 Henry Kitchell Webster (1875-1932) - American novelist
 James G. Webster (1951 - ) - professor at Northwestern University
 Noah Webster, Jr. (1722-1813) - American lexicographer, textbook pioneer, English-language spelling reformer, political writer, editor, and prolific author
 Maurice H. Webster (1892-1982) - Chicago architect
Stokely Webster (1912-2001) - American impressionist painter
 Towner K. Webster (1849-1922) - American industrialist
 Daniel H. Wells (1814-1891), Justice of the Peace in Nauvoo, Illinois and Lt. General of the Nauvoo Legion, mayor of Salt Lake City, Utah
 Heber M. Wells (1859-1938), first governor of Utah
 Briant H. Wells (1871-1949), Major General of U.S. army
 Elizabeth Wells Cannon (1859-1942), women's suffragist, Utah State Legislator
 Rulon S. Wells (1854-1941), Utah State Legislator, religious leader
 Orson F. Whitney (1855-1931) - politician, journalist, poet, college professor, historian, religious leader

References
Notes

Sources

External links

 Ray's Place for the genealogy of John Webster
 Governor John Webster of Hartford Connecticut and Hadley, Massachusetts
 The Connecticut State Library

1590 births
1661 deaths
American Puritans
Colonial governors of Connecticut
Founders of Hartford, Connecticut
Politicians from Hartford, Connecticut
English emigrants
Magistrates of the Connecticut General Court (1636–1662)
People from Cossington, Leicestershire